The Ivy Mills Historic District is a national historic district located in Concord Township, Delaware County, Pennsylvania, United States. It encompasses the ruins of a paper mill (erected 1829), a clerk's house (built circa 1830), and the Ivy Mills Mansion House (built 1837). The mansion house is a 2 1/2-story, five bay wide, stuccoed masonry structure, which includes a saltbox wing and a wide verandah. The original paper mill was erected in 1729, and the original mansion house in 1744. Both of the original buildings were replaced in the early-19th century by the present buildings.

This district was added to the National Register of Historic Places in 1972.

History
 In 1726, Thomas Willcox along with Thomas Brown built a mill dam across the Chester Creek.  In 1729 a paper mill was erected and the first paper was sold.  The Ivy Mills is the second oldest paper mill built in America.  Only the Rittenhouse mill in Philadelphia is older.

The first output from Ivy Mills was pressboard and then printing paper.  Thomas Willcox was a friend of Benjamin Franklin and was known to have made paper for him.  Willcox received the first order for paper used in the production of colonial and continental currency.  After 1775, the mill was devoted almost entirely to making government paper for the continental bills, loan certificates and bills of exchange.  At the time of the American Revolution, the government depended entirely on Ivy Mills for paper for currency.   The Ivy Mills supplied paper for the Continental and United States governments as well as many South American countries.  Paper was produced at Ivy Mills until 1886.  The mill gradually fell into ruins.

A mission chapel was established at Ivy Mills in 1730, making it the oldest Roman Catholic parish in Pennsylvania.  In 1837, St. Mary's Chapel was built as part of the new Ivy Mills Mansion.  Eventually the size of the congregation was sufficient to warrant the construction of a new church in 1852 named St. Thomas the Apostle Church a mile away in what would become the borough of Chester Heights.

This district was added to the National Register of Historic Places in 1972.

Gallery

External links

References

Historic districts on the National Register of Historic Places in Pennsylvania
Historic districts in Delaware County, Pennsylvania
National Register of Historic Places in Delaware County, Pennsylvania